Agide Simonazzi (11 February 1896 – 4 November 1951) was an Italian sprinter. He competed in the men's 400 metres at the 1920 Summer Olympics.

References

1896 births
1951 deaths
Athletes (track and field) at the 1920 Summer Olympics
Italian male sprinters
Italian male middle-distance runners
Olympic athletes of Italy
Place of birth missing